2009-2010 season was the 2nd Moldovan National Division season in the history of Academia UTM Chişinău.

Squad 
Squad given according to the official website at the end of the season, 31 May 2010  .

League table

References

External links 
 Official Academia UTM Website

Moldovan football clubs 2009–10 season